Eranina nigrita is a species of beetle in the family Cerambycidae. It was described by Galileo and Martins in 1991. It is known from Brazil.

References

Eranina
Beetles described in 1991